The 2003 WNBA season was the fifth season for the Minnesota Lynx. The Lynx reached their first WNBA Playoffs, but lost in 3 games to the Los Angeles Sparks in the opening round.

Offseason

Dispersal Draft

WNBA Draft

Regular season

Season standings

Season schedule

Player stats

References

Minnesota Lynx seasons
Minnesota
Minnesota Lynx